Elly Barnes MBE FCCT is the founder and chief executive of the charity Educate & Celebrate. She was voted Number 1 in the Independent on Sunday's Pink List in 2011 (now the Rainbow List), and was a judge in 2012.

Barnes was appointed Member of the Order of the British Empire in 2016 for her contribution to education, equality and diversity. She also received her honorary doctorate from the University of Aberdeen in November 2016 and won the Activist of the Year 2018 award from Diva Magazine.

Barnes has formed a close partnership with Goldsmiths University of London and together with Dr Anna Carlile wrote a book of all the research from the Educate & Celebrate Programme released in March 2018 called How To Transform Your School into An LGBT+Friendly Place: A Practical Guide for nursery, primary and secondary teachers.

Education
Barnes attended Market Bosworth High School and The Bosworth College.  She then studied for a degree in music, specialising in voice, at the Birmingham Conservatoire and then completed her Post Graduate Certificate of Education (PGCE) at the faculty of Education at the University of Central England, now known as Birmingham City University. She had her Newly qualified teacher (NQT) year at The Barclay School in Stevenage whilst studying for a Diploma in Music Technology at Hertfordshire University. Barnes completed an MA in school based explorations at Goldsmiths University.

Early LGBT+ work
Barnes first job was as a peripatetic singing teacher in Hertfordshire and London. She then obtained a permanent teaching role at Stoke Newington School in North London becoming Head of Year in 2005. That year, she  began working towards eradicating homophobic, biphobic, and transphobic language and bullying by challenging young people's (and teachers, parents and governors) perceptions of LGBT+ people.

The approach taken was to educate young people about different gender identities and sexual orientations by introducing recognisable symbols of the LGBT+ community, famous LGBT+ people and the history of the LGBT+ struggle.

During these early years  Barnes and her team created LGBT+Inclusive schemes of work for their year 7 including ICT lessons on Alan Turing, LGBT+ symbols, key rings, rainbow flag in Design & Technology and songs by queer artists in music. All the teachers in the year team contributed; the project developed over the next 7 years into a school-wide celebration of LGBT+ History Month with an integrated curriculum for which received ‘best practice’ status from Ofsted in 2012 for successfully tackling homophobic bullying and ingrained attitudes in our schools stating that ‘This approach has been highly successful.’

Educate & Celebrate
In 2010 Barnes developed her theory and practice into the ‘Educate & Celebrate’  PRIDE in Inclusion Award which incorporates teacher training, coaching and mentoring alongside a comprehensive resource programme to support schools, colleges, universities and organisations to build a future of inclusion and social justice.

See also

References

External links
 Educate & Celebrate website

English LGBT people
English LGBT rights activists
Schoolteachers from Leicestershire
Living people
Year of birth missing (living people)